Tetragonoderus assamensis is a species of beetle in the family Carabidae. It was described by Jedlicka in 1964.

References

assamensis
Beetles described in 1964